The men's javelin throw event was part of the track and field athletics programme at the 1928 Summer Olympics. The competition was held on Thursday, August 2, 1928. Twenty-eight javelin throwers from 18 nations competed.

Records
These were the standing world and Olympic records (in metres) prior to the 1928 Summer Olympics.

Erik Lundqvist set a new Olympic record in the qualification with 66.60 metres.

Results

The qualification started at 2 p.m. The best six throwers qualified for the final. The final was held on the same day and started at about 4.30 p.m.

References

Sources
 Official Olympic Report
 

Javelin
Javelin throw at the Olympics
Men's events at the 1928 Summer Olympics